Salman Khan Films (SKF) is an Indian film production and distribution company established by Bollywood actor Salman Khan and his brothers in 2011. Based in Mumbai, it mainly produces and distributes Hindi films.

Films produced and distributed by Salman Khan Films

Films produced

Films distributed

 Vikrant Rona (2022)

References

Film production companies of India
Hindi cinema
Salman Khan